"Outta Here" is the title song of the debut studio album by Dutch R&B singer-songwriter Esmée Denters. It was released as the debut single both from the artist and the album in the Netherlands on 14 April 2009, 27 April in New Zealand followed by 16 August in the UK.

It is Denters's most successful single to date, reaching number three in the Netherlands, seven in the United Kingdom and the top twenty in New Zealand and Ireland.

Background
Denters said in a UK interview that this song inspired the name of the album. Speaking of the album she said 

The song has been written by Jason Perry and Ester Dean with Justin Timberlake and Polow da Don providing the production. It is also the debut single to be released on Timberlake's own record label Tennman Records.
It was one of the last songs written for the album.

Critical reception
David Balls of Digital Spy said "'Outta Here', co-written and produced by Justin Timberlake, is very much the typical R&B-tinged pop debut - the sort of thing deployed by the likes of Mandy Moore, Stacie Orrico. "I feel so betrayed, what a waste of my heart," Denters wails as she launches into a chorus but unfortunately there are no real signs of passion or charisma here."

The BBC gave "Outta Here" 3 out of 5 stars, calling it 'fun' and 'good'. Music Focus Release said that ""Outta Here" isn't a song that immediately grabs you. In fact on the first listen we found ourselves a little disappointed and indifferent."

Charts

Weekly charts

Year-end charts

Certifications and sales

Release history

References

2009 debut singles
Dutch dance-pop songs
Contemporary R&B songs
Esmée Denters songs
Music videos directed by Diane Martel
Song recordings produced by Polow da Don
Songs written by Polow da Don
Songs written by Jason Perry (singer)
Songs written by Justin Timberlake
Songs written by Ester Dean
Song recordings produced by Justin Timberlake
2009 songs